or  or  is a lake on the border between Norway and Sweden. The name of the lake comes from the Sami languages, with the ending -jávri or -jávrre being the word for "lake".

See also
List of lakes in Norway

References

Gällivare Municipality
Lakes of Norrbotten County
Narvik
Lakes of Nordland
Norway–Sweden border
International lakes of Europe